Owen Bush (November 10, 1921 – June 12, 2001) was an American actor. Born in Savannah, Missouri, he went on to have a lengthy career in television and film. He portrayed the pivotal character "Benson January" in the season 4 Maverick episode "Bolt From the Blue" written and directed by Robert Altman and starring Roger Moore.  His best-known roles were on the soap opera Passions and in the last 2 Prehysteria! films as Mr. Cranston.

Filmography

References

External links

1921 births
2001 deaths
American male soap opera actors
American male film actors
American male television actors
People from Savannah, Missouri
20th-century American male actors